Dioscorea cayenensis subsp. rotundata, commonly known as the white yam, West African yam, Guinea yam, or white ñame, is a subspecies of yam native to Africa. It is one of the most important cultivated yams. Kokoro is one of its most important cultivars.

It is sometimes treated as separate species from Dioscorea cayenensis.

Domestication
Its wild progenitor is Dioscorea praehensilis and possibly also D. abyssinica (by hybridization). Domestication occurred in West Africa, along the south-facing Atlantic coast. There is insufficient documentation and  insufficient research to guess how long ago that occurred.

Distribution
D. c. subsp. rotundata is grown in West Africa, including countries such as Ivory Coast, Ghana and Nigeria.

Linguistics
Blench (2006) reconstructs the tentative Proto-Niger-Congo (i.e., the most recent common ancestor of the Niger-Congo languages) root -ku for D. rotundata.

References

Crops originating from Africa
Yams (vegetable)
Flora of West Tropical Africa
Plant subspecies
cayenensis subsp. rotundata